A gate dielectric is a dielectric used between the gate and substrate of a field-effect transistor (such as a MOSFET). In state-of-the-art processes, the gate dielectric is subject to many constraints, including:

 Electrically clean interface to the substrate (low density of quantum states for electrons)
 High capacitance, to increase the FET transconductance
 High thickness, to avoid dielectric breakdown and leakage by quantum tunneling.

The capacitance and thickness constraints are almost directly opposed to each other.  For silicon-substrate FETs, the gate dielectric is almost always silicon dioxide (called "gate oxide"), since thermal oxide has a very clean interface.  However, the semiconductor industry is interested in finding alternative materials with higher dielectric constants, which would allow higher capacitance with the same thickness.

History
The earliest gate dielectric used in a field-effect transistor was silicon dioxide (SiO2). The silicon and silicondioxide surface passivation process was developed by Egyptian engineer Mohamed M. Atalla at Bell Labs during the late 1950s, and then used in the first MOSFETs (metal–oxide–semiconductor field-effect transistors). Silicon dioxide remains the standard gate dielectric in MOSFET technology.

See also
 QBD (electronics)

References

Dielectrics
Semiconductor structures
Arab inventions
Egyptian inventions
Field-effect transistors
MOSFETs